Alfredo “Freddie” Martínez (born March 15, 1957) is a former professional baseball player who played two seasons for the California Angels of Major League Baseball. He lives in Lincoln Heights, California

References

1957 births
Living people
Major League Baseball pitchers
Cal State Los Angeles Golden Eagles baseball players
California Angels players
Whittier Poets baseball players
Baseball players from Los Angeles
People from Lincoln Heights, Los Angeles